Anthony Michaelides (born 1953, Fallowfield, Manchester) is known for working as a promotions executive in the music industry handling radio and TV promotions for over thirty years. In 1980, Michaelides was responsible for arranging the first televised performance outside of Ireland by U2. His clients have included U2, The Police, Peter Gabriel, David Bowie, The Stone Roses, Bob Marley, Depeche Mode, Massive Attack, New Order, Bryan Adams, Dave Matthews, The Carpenters, Matchbox Twenty, Pixies, Take That and many more.

Biography
He attended Moseley Hall Grammar School and later Fielden Park College.Michaelides  spent years specializing in the launching, promotion, and artist development of both British and International Artists’ careers. He has also been a music industry consultant, mentor, and advisor to numerous associations, music consortiums and colleges over the years.

Beginning in 1974, Michaelides  has worked with many Record Labels including Island Records, Factory Records and BMG. In 1997 He took on the role as publicist for David Bowie's Earthling Tour. Michaelides has received numerous accolades from music professionals and associations. After the United States Government granted him with an Alien of Extraordinary Ability Green Card (see:), he moved to Florida to pursue a career as an author and further his career as a professional public speaker.

History
Transatlantic Records – In 1974, Michaelides began his sales and marketing career working for the independent British record label Transatlantic Records as their Northern Sales Representative. He sold jazz, folk and blues records out of his van to major record stores such as Transatlantic and its subsidiaries Blue Note, Milestone and Nonesuch.

ABC/Dunhill (Anchor Records UK) – In 1976 Michaelides moved to ABC/Dunhill as Regional Sales Representative.

Island Records – In 1978, Michaelides joined Island Records as their Regional Promotion Manager responsible for the coordination and organization of all media activities for their artists in Northern England. During this time Tony also promoted Stiff Records artists' such as Elvis Costello. Due to financial difficulties, the entire Regional Promotions Team was laid off in 1980.

Charisma Records - Immediately upon leaving Island Records,  Michaelides joined Charisma Records as Regional Promotion Manager working directly with artists such as Peter Gabriel and Genesis. After 9 months, he left Charisma and went back to Island.

Island Records / Stiff Records - In 1981, Michaelides returned to Island Records to head their Regional Department including artist development and radio and television promotions for artists like Bob Marley, Grace Jones and Stevie Winwood. One of Michaelides's first projects when returning to Island was developing the newly signed U2 beginning with their debut album Boy through the multi-platinum release The Unforgettable Fire. This was also one of Islands Records' most successful periods ever with releases from artists such as U2, Frankie Goes to Hollywood (Welcome to the Pleasuredome) and Bob Marley’s album, Legend, which topped the UK album chart for 12 weeks remaining on the UK chart for a total of 265 weeks. It is the best selling reggae album of all time (13.5 million platinum in US), with sales of 25 million copies.

TMP (Tony Michaelides Promotions) – In 1982 Michaelides began an independent operation named TMP on Princess Street, Manchester. TMP became one of the biggest independent promotions companies in the UK music business, promoting both UK and international artists to regional radio and TV.

The Circa - The Circa label contracted Michaelides to represent their artists including Massive Attack, Neneh Cherry, and Hue and Cry.  In 1984, he secured a contract with Arista Records and later with RCA and began working BMG’s entire roster. Before long his promotion company was expanding at a remarkable rate and TMP was working with Mute Records, Rhythm King and 4AD Records to name a few. In the early 1980s he created all regional radio and television promotions at Factory Records for their founder Tony Wilson and continued to work for them for 10 years until their demise in the early 1990s.  Tony then forged a long-standing relationship with BMG, enjoying their one of their most successful periods ever with Annie Lennox, Whitney Houston, Take That, Natalie Imbruglia, Westlife, and Puff Daddy.  It was during this period, he spent several years working with the Simon’s: Simon Fuller and Simon Cowell.

The Last Radio Program – In 1984, Michaelides replaced Mark Radcliffe on Piccadilly Radio, presenting their specialist music program The Last Radio Programme for Key 103 in Manchester. He took the on-air name of “Tony the Greek”  and remained as presenter for this program for the next 13 years. Throughout the show, Michaelides helped to launch careers for bands like The Stone Roses, Happy Mondays, Simply Red, James and R.E.M. He conducted interviews with artists regularly and was arguably one of the first to introduce the now familiar Acoustic Set to UK radio in 1985. While working on The Last Radio Show, Tony was nominated for several Sony Music Awards for Best Specialist Music Show.

1997 Michaelides was asked to be publicist for David Bowie’s Earthling Tour, responsible for press, radio, and television.
The following year TMP worked closely with Lippman Entertainment, one of the world’s most successful management companies, to launch Matchbox Twenty in the UK. At the same time, he was also a working with Warner Chappell’s LA office and Atlantic Records’ New York office.

Around 2000 Michaelides became a consultant for the Manchester Business Consortium, a member of the Brits Voting Academy and a provided expert advice to the Music Managers Forum's master classes. Beginning with its inception in 1992, he was a regular panelist and moderator at the UK’s major music conference, In the City and was also one of the founding members of The Manchester Music City Network. Tony continued mentoring sessions in the UK as well as Canada's North by Northwest festival until deciding to move to the United States in 2004.  Prior to relocating to the US, Michaelides was tagged by the United States Government as an “Alien of Extraordinary Ability”(see:).  This is a classification that is granted only to "that small percentage who have risen to the very top of the field of endeavor".

Magic Leap - In December 2010 Michaelides joined Magic Leap, a U.S. based multimedia augmented reality company. As of 2015, he works as "Chief Evangelist" for the company utilizing his past working with musicians and artists around the world to bring in content as well as promoting the company.

Michaelides continues working as an Artist Development Consultant and has become an author. His book, the Insights Collection: Insights From The Engine Room, was published late 2009 by Janson Media Group.

Michaelides currently resides in Florida and continues writing and speaking to multi-disciplinary audiences both domestically and internationally.

References

External links
 BBC
 Artists and Writers Group
 Kent MusicBiz - Classic Venues
 Cerysmatic Factory
 Six Finger Learning - THINK TANK

Living people
British music industry executives
1953 births
People from Fallowfield